From the Cradle to Enslave is the second EP by English extreme metal band Cradle of Filth, released on 30 October 1999 by record labels Music for Nations (Europe) and Metal Blade (US).

Recording and content 

The EP was recorded during a period of upheaval for the band, with Gian Pyres and Nicholas Barker leaving prior to its release (Pyres would return for the recording of Midian) and Stuart Anstis and Les Smith departing the band soon afterwards.

From the Cradle to Enslave contains two original compositions: the title track and "Of Dark Blood and Fucking". The rest of the disc consists of a re-recording of a track from the album Dusk... and Her Embrace and two or three cover versions, depending on the region (the US release includes "Dawn of Eternity" instead of the European version's title track remix "Pervert's Church").

Release 

From the Cradle to Enslave was released on 30 October 1999 by record labels Music for Nations (Europe) and Metal Blade (US). It reached number 84 in the UK Albums Chart.

Reception 

AllMusic described the EP as "a worthy addition to any fan's collection, featuring several songs that rank with the best of their work".

Dani Filth revealed his antipathy towards the title track in Kerrang!: "We have to play it at every gig... I'd like to erase it, so I wouldn't have to play it again. After a while you just want to play something different. There's something about the hook that just strikes a chord of fear down my spine."

Track listing

PanDaemonAeon 

"From the Cradle to Enslave" was the first of Cradle of Filth's songs to have an accompanying music video. It was directed by Alex Chandon, who would go on to produce further promo clips and DVD documentaries for the band, as well as the full-length feature film Cradle of Fear. The video features explicit images of nudity and gore and was released in two versions, one edited (supposedly to make it MTV-friendly) and one uncut. Both contain a reference to the Cruelty and the Beast cover art, when a woman is seen emerging from a bathtub filling with blood. Both versions can be found on PanDaemonAeon, which was released on VHS on October 5, 1999 and on DVD in 2002. The DVD also includes a "Making-of" documentary and a short live show, recorded at the London Astoria on 5 June 1998.

Astoria Show track list

 "Dusk and Her Embrace"
 "Beneath the Howling Stars"
 "Cruelty Brought Thee Orchids"
 "Malice Through the Looking Glass"

Personnel 
 Cradle of Filth

 Dani Filth – lead vocals
 Stuart Anstis – lead guitar
 Gian Pyres – rhythm guitar
 Robin Graves – bass
 Lecter – keyboards
 Was Sarginson – drums on "From the Cradle to Enslave", "Death Comes Ripping" and "Sleepless"
 Adrian Erlandsson – drums on "Of Dark Blood and Fucking" and "Dawn of Eternity"
 Nicholas Barker – drums on "Funeral in Carpathia (Be Quick or Be Dead Version)"
 Sarah Jezebel Deva – backing vocals

 Production
Mike Exeter, Dan Spriggs - engineers on tracks 1-4, mixing on tracks 3-4
John Fryer - mixing on tracks 1 and 2
Mark Harwodd - engineer and mixing on "Funeral in Carpathia" and "Dawn of Eternity"
Damien Clarke and Lecter - remixing of "Perverts Church"
Noel Sommerville - mastering

Charts

References

External links 

 
 

Cradle of Filth albums
1999 EPs
Music for Nations albums
Metal Blade Records EPs